John Scofield (born December 26, 1951), sometimes referred to as "Sco", is an American guitarist and composer whose music over a long career has blended jazz, jazz fusion, funk, blues, soul and rock. He first came to mainstream attention in the band of Miles Davis, and has toured and recorded with many prominent jazz artists, including saxophonists Eddie Harris, Dave Liebman, Joe Henderson and Joe Lovano; keyboardists George Duke, Joey DeFrancesco, Herbie Hancock, Larry Goldings and Robert Glasper; fellow guitarists Pat Metheny, John Abercrombie, Pat Martino and Bill Frisell; bassists Marc Johnson and Jaco Pastorius; and drummer Billy Cobham and Dennis Chambers. Outside the world of jazz, he has collaborated with Phil Lesh, Mavis Staples, John Mayer, Medeski Martin & Wood, and Gov’t Mule.

Biography
Scofield was born in Ohio but, when he was still a baby, his family moved to Wilton, Connecticut, where he discovered his interest in music. Educated at the Berklee College of Music, Scofield left school to record with Chet Baker and Gerry Mulligan. He joined the Billy Cobham/George Duke Band soon after and spent two years playing, recording, and touring with them. He recorded with Charles Mingus in 1976 and replaced Pat Metheny in Gary Burton's quartet.

In 1976 Scofield signed with Enja, which released his first album, John Scofield, in 1977. He recorded with pianist Hal Galper on Rough House in 1978 and then on Galper's album Ivory Forest (1980), where he played a solo rendition of "Monk's Mood" by Thelonious Monk. In 1979 he formed a trio with his mentor Steve Swallow and Adam Nussbaum which, with drummer Bill Stewart replacing Nussbaum, became the signature group of Scofield's career.

In 1982, he joined Miles Davis, with whom he remained for three and a half years. He contributed tunes and guitar to three of Davis's albums, Star People, Decoy, and You're Under Arrest. After he left Davis, he released Electric Outlet (1984) and Still Warm (1985)

He started what is referred to as his Blue Matter Band, with Dennis Chambers on drums, Gary Grainger on bass, and Mitchel Forman, Robert Aries, or Jim Beard on keyboards. The band released the albums Blue Matter, Loud Jazz and Pick Hits Live. Marc Johnson formed Bass Desires with Peter Erskine, Bill Frisell, and Scofield. This "most auspicious [pairing] since John McLaughlin and Carlos Santana" recorded two albums, Bass Desires (1986) and Second Sight (1987).

At the beginning of the 1990s, Scofield formed a quartet that included Joe Lovano with whom he recorded several albums for Blue Note. Time on My Hands (1990), with Joe Lovano, Charlie Haden, and Jack DeJohnette, showcased Scofield's guitar and Mingus-influenced writing. Bill Stewart became the group's drummer and played on Meant to Be (1991) and What We Do (1993). In 1992, Scofield released Grace Under Pressure, featuring guitarist Bill Frisell, with Charlie Haden on bass and Joey Baron on drums. Stewart rejoined Scofield and Steve Swallow for I Can See Your House from Here,  a collaboration with Pat Metheny.

Near the end of his time with Blue Note, Scofield returned to a sound that included more funk and soul jazz. In 1994 and 1995, he formed a group with organist/pianist Larry Goldings, bassist Dennis Irwin, and alternately drummers, Bill Stewart and Idris Muhammad. The group toured extensively, and the albums Hand Jive and Groove Elation feature this funk/groove/soul-jazz dimension in Scofield's music with tenor saxophonist Eddie Harris, percussionist Don Alias, and trumpeter Randy Brecker. He recorded the 1997 album A Go Go with avant-garde jazz trio Medeski, Martin & Wood.

Also during this period he began to work with British composer Mark-Anthony Turnage. He appeared as a soloist on Turnage's Blood on the Floor: Elegy for Andy. They collaborated on Scorched, an album  of Turnage's orchestrations of Scofield's compositions, largely from the Blue Matter period. John Patitucci and Peter Erskine performed at the live premiere of Scorched at the Alte Oper in Frankfurt in September 2002  with the Radio-Symphony-Orchestra Frankfurt and the hr-Bigband. The performance was recorded and released by Deutsche Grammophon.

Scofield released Überjam in 2002 and Up All Night in 2003, two albums on which he experimented with drum and bass. He recorded in Europe with the Bugge Wesseltoft New Conception of Jazz in 2001–2002 and 2006. In 2004 EnRoute: John Scofield Trio LIVE was released with Steve Swallow on bass and Bill Stewart on drums. It was recorded live at the Blue Note Jazz Club in New York City in December 2003. This was followed the next year by That's What I Say: John Scofield Plays the Music of Ray Charles. This led to performances with Mavis Staples, Gary Versace on organ, John Benitez on bass, and Steve Hass on drums. After sitting in for two engagements in December 2005 with Phil Lesh and Friends, Scofield has since played numerous shows with the band.

On September 26, 2006 he released Out Louder, his second collaboration with Medeski, Martin & Wood. The group, known collectively as MSMW, toured worldwide in 2006 and 2007. Scofield performed in a duo with John Medeski named The Johns and in a trio with Medeski and drummer Adam Deitch. He recorded music inspired by gospel on the 2009 album Piety Street with Jon Cleary and George Porter Jr.

On September 18, 2007 EmArcy released This Meets That, an album recorded with Steve Swallow, Bill Stewart, and a horn trio. In 2011 EmArcy released A Moment's Peace, recorded with pianist Larry Goldings, bassist Scott Colley, and drummer Brian Blade. Scofield's 2010 album 54 had its origin in the 1990s when Vince Mendoza asked him to play on his first album. As director of the Metropole Orchestra, Mendoza collaborated with Scofield on arrangements of Scofield's compositions that were performed by the orchestra.

Scofield has been an adjunct faculty member in the Jazz Department in the Steinhardt School of Education at New York University.

With Inside Scofield, a film by Joerg Steineck, a feature-length documentary about the master musician John Scofield was released in 2022.

Awards and honors
 1997: Honorary Doctorate of Music from Berklee
 1998: Miles Davis Award, Montreal International Jazz Festival
 2002: Grammy nomination for Best Contemporary Jazz Album: Überjam
 2004: Grammy nomination for Best Contemporary Jazz Album: Scorched, and Best Jazz Instrumental Solo for "Wee"
 2006: Grammy nomination for Best Jazz Instrumental Album, Individual or Group: Trio Beyond - Saudades
 2010: Grammy nomination for Best Large Jazz Ensemble Album: 54 featured with Metropole Orkest conducted by Vince Mendoza
 2010: Ordre des Arts et des Lettres, French Ministry of Culture
 2016: Grammy Award for Best Jazz Instrumental Album: Past Present, and nominated for Best Improvised Jazz Solo: "Past Present"
 2017: Grammy Award for Best Jazz Instrumental Album: Country for Old Men
 2017: Grammy Award for Best Improvised Jazz Solo: "I'm So Lonesome I Could Cry"

Discography

As leader and co-leader

Compilations
Slo Sco: The Best of the Ballads (Gramavision, 1990)
Liquid Fire: The Best of John Scofield (Gramavision, 1994)
Best of John Scofield (Blue Note, 1996)
Steady Groovin': The Blue Note Groove Sides (Blue Note, 2000)
Sco-Mule (Evil Teen Records, 2015)

As a sideman
Albums listed by year of release. (Links to artists and labels on first appearance.)

References

External links 

Official site
Inside Scofield (2022), documentary on John Scofield

1951 births
20th-century American composers
20th-century American guitarists
20th-century jazz composers
21st-century American guitarists
American jazz guitarists
Grammy Award winners
Jazz-funk guitarists
Jazz fusion guitarists
Lead guitarists
American jazz composers
American male jazz composers
Miles Davis
Berklee College of Music alumni
Steinhardt School of Culture, Education, and Human Development faculty
People from Wilton, Connecticut
Guitarists from Connecticut
Musicians from Dayton, Ohio
Living people
Guitarists from Ohio
American male guitarists
Trio Beyond members
Manhattan Jazz Quintet members
Motéma Music artists
Verve Records artists
Blue Note Records artists
Gramavision Records artists
African-American guitarists